Yenga may refer to:

Places
 Yenga, Central African Republic, a village in Nana-Mambéré Prefecture, Central African Republic
 Yenga, Republic of the Congo, a village in Sangha, Republic of the Congo, 
 Yenga, Sierra Leone, a village in Eastern Province, Sierra Leone
 Yenga, Uganda, a village in Bundibugyo District, Uganda

People
 Biselenge Yenga, footballer (soccer player) for the Swiss FC Le Mont, q.v.
 Careca Yenga, footballer (soccer player) for the French FC Mantes and JA Drancy, q.v.
 Yannick Yenga (b. 1985), Congolese footballer (soccer player)
 Yenga Yenga Junior, band member of Zaiko Langa Langa, q.v.

See also
 Yanga (disambiguation)
 Ould Yenge, a town and municipality in Mauritania